In science and engineering, a system is the part of the universe that is being studied, while the environment is the remainder of the universe that lies outside the boundaries of the system.  It is also known as the surroundings or neighborhood, and in thermodynamics, as the reservoir.  Depending on the type of system, it may interact with the environment by exchanging mass, energy (including heat and work), linear momentum, angular momentum, electric charge, or other conserved properties.  In some disciplines, such as information theory, information may also be exchanged.  The environment is ignored in analysis of the system, except in regard to these interactions.

See also

Bioenergetic systems – energy system
Earth system science
Environment (biophysical)
Environmental Management System
Thermodynamic system

External links
 Geography of transport systems people.hofstra.edu
 Environmental Management Systems epa.gov
 Earth's Environmental Systems eesc.columbia.edu
 Environmental Education
Thermodynamic systems